WTR may refer to:

Woomera Test Range
World Trademark Review
Within the Ruins, an American metalcore band
Working time reduction
The EU Wire Transfer Regulation